Oakland is a city in Douglas County, Oregon, United States, located  from Interstate 5. The population was 927 at the 2010 census.

History
Oakland was the first city to be placed on the state's historic register, in May 1968. The city's two-block business district consists of the original brick buildings built in the 1880s and 1890s. Stearns Hardware has been in operation since 1887, which has occupied the Stearns Hardware Building since it was built in 1891. Over 80 properties in the city were constructed between 1852 and 1890. The Oakland Historic District was listed on the National Register of Historic Places in March 1979.

Several films have been shot in Oakland, including Fire in the Sky, Didi's Last Wish, and Grand Tour: Disaster in Time.

Geography
Calapooya Creek, a tributary of the Umpqua River, flows by Oakland.

Climate
This region experiences warm (but not hot) and dry summers, with no average monthly temperatures above .  According to the Köppen Climate Classification system, Oakland has a warm-summer Mediterranean climate, abbreviated "Csb" on climate maps.

Demographics

2010 census
As of the census of 2010, there were 927 people, 380 households, and 256 families living in the city. The racial makeup of the city was 94.2% White, 0.1% African American, 1.4% Native American, 0.3% Asian, 1.2% from other races, and 2.8% from two or more races. Hispanic or Latino of any race were 3.0% of the population.

There were 380 households, of which 31.8% had children under the age of 18 living with them, 46.1% were married couples living together, 13.4% had a female householder with no husband present, 7.9% had a male householder with no wife present, and 32.6% were non-families. 25.3% of all households were made up of individuals, and 10% had someone living alone who was 65 years of age or older. The average household size was 2.44 and the average family size was 2.89.

The median age in the city was 40.8 years. 23.6% of residents were under the age of 18; 9% were between the ages of 18 and 24; 21.9% were from 25 to 44; 31.2% were from 45 to 64; and 14.1% were 65 years of age or older. The gender makeup of the city was 50.2% male and 49.8% female.

2000 census
As of the census of 2000, there were 954 people, 377 households, and 257 families living in the city. The population density was 1,340.8 people per square mile (518.8/km). There were 404 housing units at an average density of 567.8 per square mile (219.7/km). The racial makeup of the city was 93.82% White, 0.21% African American, 1.99% Native American, 0.10% Asian, 0.21% Pacific Islander, 0.10% from other races, and 3.56% from two or more races. 3.35% of the population were Hispanic or Latino of any race.

There were 377 households, out of which 34.0% had children under the age of 18 living with them, 55.7% were married couples living together, 9.5% had a female householder with no husband present, and 31.8% were non-families. 23.3% of all households were made up of individuals, and 9.0% had someone living alone who was 65 years of age or older. The average household size was 2.53 and the average family size was 3.06.

In the city, the population was spread out, with 26.5% under the age of 18, 8.0% from 18 to 24, 24.4% from 25 to 44, 26.0% from 45 to 64, and 15.1% who were 65 years of age or older. The median age was 40 years. For every 100 females, there were 97.1 males. For every 100 females age 18 and over, there were 98.0 males.

The median income for a household in the city was $29,479, and the median income for a family was $35,795. Males had a median income of $27,917 versus $19,554 for females. The per capita income for the city was $14,867. 15.0% of the population and 10.1% of families were below the poverty line. Out of the total population, 22.1% of those under the age of 18 and 6.1% of those 65 and older were living below the poverty line.

Notable people

 Elgin V. Kuykendall (1870–1958), lawyer, judge, and Washington State Senator was born in Oakland.
 Major General Tammy Smith (1963– ) deputy commanding general-sustainment for the 8th Army.  First openly gay officer to come out after repeal of Don't Ask, Don't Tell policy.  Winner of Bronze Star and Legion of Merit.

References

External links
Entry for Oakland in the Oregon Blue Book

Cities in Oregon
Cities in Douglas County, Oregon
1878 establishments in Oregon
Populated places established in 1878